The Polytechnical Institute of Lisbon (Instituto Politécnico de Lisboa) is one of the biggest state-run polytechnic institutes in Portugal. It was founded in Lisbon during in 1985, being composed by several higher education institutes and schools, some of them with a longer history. In total, 12,933 students were enrolled on all schools for the 2007-2008 school-year.

Institutes and schools 
ISEL - Lisbon College of Engineering (Instituto Superior de Engenharia de Lisboa)
ISCAL - Lisbon College of Accountancy and Administration (Instituto Superior de Contabilidade e Administração de Lisboa)
ESELx - Lisbon College of Education (Escola Superior de Educação de Lisboa)
ESCS - Lisbon College of Communication (Escola Superior de Comunicação Social)
ESTeSL - Lisbon College of Health Technology (Escola Superior de Tecnologia da Saúde de Lisboa)
ESTC - Lisbon Theatre and Film School (Escola Superior de Teatro e Cinema)
ESML - Lisbon College of Music (Escola Superior de Música de Lisboa)
ESD - Lisbon College of Dance (Escola Superior de Dança)

See also

list of colleges and universities in Portugal
Higher education in Portugal

External links
IPL - Instituto Politécnico de Lisboa
ISEL - Instituto Superior de Engenharia de Lisboa
ISCAL - Instituto Superior de Contabilidade e Administração de Lisboa
ESELx - Escola Superior de Educação de Lisboa
ESCS - Escola Superior de Comunicação Social
ESTeSL - Escola Superior de Tecnologia da Saúde de Lisboa
Lisbon Theatre and Film School (ESTC - Escola Superior de Teatro e Cinema)
ESML - Escola Superior de Música de Lisboa
ESD - Escola Superior de Dança

Polytechnics in Portugal
Education in Lisbon
Educational institutions established in 1985
1985 establishments in Portugal